

Central courts

Royal Courts of Justice
The Royal Courts of Justice are situated in lower Chichester Street, Belfast opposite the Waterfront Hall and beside Laganside Courts. It is the location of the high court and court of appeal of Northern Ireland.

Laganside Courts
The Laganside Courts are situated in Oxford Street in the centre of Belfast opposite the Waterfront Hall and beside the Royal Courts of Justice. They house the Crown Court, county courts, magistrates' courts, Youth Court, family proceedings courts, the Fixed Penalty Office, Civil Processing Centre and Fine Recovery Team.

County courts
Antrim Courthouse
Armagh Courthouse
Ballymena Courthouse
Coleraine Courthouse
Craigavon Courthouse
Downpatrick Courthouse
Dungannon Courthouse
Enniskillen Courthouse
Limavady Courthouse
Lisburn Courthouse
Londonderry Courthouse
Magherafelt Courthouse
Newry Courthouse
Newtownards Courthouse
Omagh Courthouse
Strabane Courthouse

See also
Royal Courts of Justice, Belfast
Lord Chief Justice of Northern Ireland
List of Lords Justices of Appeal of Northern Ireland
List of High Court judges of Northern Ireland
Northern Ireland law

References

Courts of Northern Ireland